Bommai may refer to:

Bommai (film), a 1964 film
Basavaraj Bommai
S. R. Bommai